Thugs Revenge is the sixth solo studio album by American rapper Bizzy Bone. It was released on February 28, 2006 via B-Dub/Thump Records. Production was primarily handled by Mr. Criminal at the Crime Lab, except for the song "When We Ride", which was produced by Fingazz. It features guest appearances from Mr. Capone-E, who also served as executive producer, Bad Azz, K.O., Layzie Bone, Mr. Criminal and Mr. Silent. The album peaked at number 168 on the Billboard 200, number 39 on the Top R&B/Hip-Hop Albums and number 24 on the Top Rap Albums in the United States.

Track listing

Charts

References

External links

2006 albums
Bizzy Bone albums